The Light welterweight competition was the fifth lightest class featured at the 2011 World Amateur Boxing Championships, held at the Heydar Aliyev Sports and Exhibition Complex.

Medalists

Seeds

  Roniel Solotongo (first round)
  Uranchimegiin Mönkh-Erdene (quarterfinals)
  Gyula Káté (quarterfinals)
  Ray Moylette (second round)
  Tom Stalker (semifinals)
  Éverton Lopes (champion)
  Juan Romero (second round)
  Heybatulla Hajialiyev (quarterfinals)
  Onur Şipal (second round)

Draw

Finals

Round of 128

Top half

Section 1

Section 2

Bottom half

Section 3

Section 4

External links
Draw

Light welterweight